State Route 78 (abbreviated SR 78) is a  long primary state highway in northwestern Tennessee, USA.  This highway carries a dual primary and secondary designation, however, the majority of this highway is signed as a Primary State Highway. The only portion of SR 78 designated as secondary is between its southern terminus at SR 104 to US 51 in Dyersburg.

Route description

SR 78 begins in Dyersburg as a 5-lane urban highway (with center turn lane) featuring a  speed limit. North of US 51/SR 3 the road expands to a 7-lane urban highway and features the highest traffic counts in the Dyersburg area, frequently rising above 30,000 AADT. This section of SR 78 at one time featured  speed limits, however, due to excessive traffic this section has been reduced to a  speed limit. Locals in Dyersburg refer to the section between US 51 and I-155 as 'Hamburger Alley' because of the number of fast food restaurants lining this section of the highway.  North of I-155 the highway quickly transitions from a 4-lane divided highway to a rural 2-lane highway carrying a  speed limit. There is also a short 4-lane undivided section within the Ridgely city limits. SR 78 provides direct access to Reelfoot Lake State Park via SR 213 on the west side of the lake, and the park's headquarters and visitor's center on the south end of the lake via SR 21/SR 22. Access to the Northwest Correctional Complex is accomplished via SR 212 north of Tiptonville.

SR 78 is bannered as a Tennessee Scenic Parkway from its southern terminus in Dyersburg to Tiptonville at the intersection of SR 78 and SR 21/SR 22. SR 78 also carries the Great River Road designation from its intersection with SR 79 all the way to its northern terminus at the Kentucky/Tennessee state line. This highway starts out in rolling, hilly terrain and descends the first Chickasaw Bluff shortly before reaching Bogota, from this point north, the highway traverses low-lying farmland and bottomland. The Obion River crossing south of Bogota, Tennessee once held the distinction of being the oldest highway bridge in Tennessee that was still in service. The old bridge at this river crossing has since been demolished and replaced by a modern concrete bridge featuring two lanes with full-width shoulders.

Major intersections

See also

 List of state routes in Tennessee
 List of highways numbered 78

References
 Tennessee Department of Transportation
 Lake County Highway Map
 Obion County Highway Map
 Dyer County Highway Map
 Dyersburg City Highway Map

External links

078
078
Transportation in Dyer County, Tennessee
Transportation in Obion County, Tennessee
Transportation in Lake County, Tennessee